Dylan Cartlidge is a rapper and multi-instrumentalist. His music incorporates elements of funk, soul, hip hop, gospel rock, and R&B. He is known for his hopeful narratives. He was featured in the first episode of BBC documentary The Mighty Redcar, where he was seeking a record deal. He signed to Glassnote Records in 2018.

Cartlidge was named to NPR World Cafe's '30 Under 30', following his on air appearance in 2021. He has also appeared at Glastonbury Festival, SXSW, The Great Escape, and BBC Radio 1's Big Weekend at Middlesbrough.

Discography

Album
 Hope Above Adversity (2021)

EPs
 Yellow Brick Road (2020)
 Monsters Under the Bed (2019)

Singles
 "Anything Could Happen" (2021), featured as "top tune" on KCRW.
 "Hang My Head" (2021)
 "Dare to Dream" (2021), which was included on James Gunn's most-listened-to tracks of 2021.
 "Yellow Brick Road" (2021)
 "Higher" (2019)
 "Love Spoons" (2017)

Other appearances
 "Because" on Cheat Codes by Danger Mouse and Black Thought (2022)
 "It's Raining" on World Wide Pop by Superorganism (2022)

References

Living people
English rappers
Glassnote Records artists
Musicians from Staffordshire

1994 births